The New Mexico Renegades were a Tier III Junior A ice hockey team, based in Rio Rancho, New Mexico. The team played in the Mountain Division of the Western States Hockey League (WSHL). Their home games were played at the Blades Multiplex Arena. In 2014, the Renegades moved to Springfield, Missouri, and were renamed the Springfield Express.

History
The franchise was founded in 2005 as the Cajun Catahoulas, based in Carencro, Louisiana. For the 2008–09 season the team was relocated North Richland Hills, Texas and renamed the Texas Renegades. After one season in Texas, the team was moved to Rio Rancho, New Mexico and became the New Mexico Renegades.
Prior to the 2011–12 season, the Renegades were purchased by Revolution Sports Management, Inc., which later moved the team to Springfield, Missouri.

Season-by-season records

References

Ice hockey teams in New Mexico
Sports in Rio Rancho, New Mexico
2009 establishments in New Mexico
Ice hockey clubs established in 2009
2014 disestablishments in New Mexico
Ice hockey clubs disestablished in 2014